The 124th Ohio Infantry Regiment, sometimes 124th Regiment, Ohio Volunteer Infantry (or 124th OVI) was an infantry regiment in the Union Army during the American Civil War.

Service
The 124th Ohio Infantry was organized in Cleveland, Ohio, and mustered in for three years service on January 1, 1863, under the command of Colonel Oliver Hazard Payne.

The regiment was attached to District of Western Kentucky, Department of the Ohio, to February 1863. Franklin, Tennessee, Army of Kentucky, Department of the Cumberland, to June 1863. 2nd Brigade, 2nd Division, XXI Corps, Army of the Cumberland, to October 1863. 2nd Brigade, 3rd Division, IV Corps, Army of the Cumberland, to June 1865.

The 124th Ohio Infantry mustered out of service at Nashville, Tennessee, on July 9, 1865.

Detailed service
Left Ohio for Louisville, Ky., January 1; then moved to Elizabethtown, Ky., and duty there until February 10, 1863. Moved to Nashville, Tenn., February 10, 1863; then to Franklin February 21, and duty there until June. Action at Thompson's Station, Spring Hill, March 4–5. Thompson's Station June 2. Tullahoma Campaign June 23-July 7. Camp at Manchester until August 16. Passage of the Cumberland Mountains and Tennessee River and Chickamauga Campaign August 16-September 22. At Poe's Tavern August 20-September 9. Passage of the Tennessee River September 10. Lee and Gordon's Mills September 11–13. Battle of Chickamauga September 19–20. Siege of Chattanooga, Tenn., September 24-November 23. Reopening Tennessee River October 26–29. Brown's Ferry October 27. Chattanooga-Ringgold Campaign November 23–27. Orchard Knob November 23–24. Missionary Ridge November 25. March to relief of Knoxville, Tenn., November 28-December 8. Operations in eastern Tennessee until April 1864. Operations about Dandridge January 16–17. Atlanta  Campaign May 1 to September 8. Demonstrations on Rocky Faced Ridge and Dalton, Ga., May 8–13. Battle of Resaca May 14–16. Adairsville May 17. Near Kingston May 18–19. Near Cassville May 19. Advance on Dallas May 22–25. Operations on line of Pumpkin Vine Creek and battles about Dallas, New Hope Church, and Allatoona Hills May 25-June 5. Pickett's Mills May 27. Operations about Marietta and against Kennesaw Mountain June 10-July 2. Pine Hill June 11–14. Lost Mountain June 15–17. Assault on Kennesaw June 27. Ruff's Station July 4. Chattahoochie River July 5–17. Peachtree Creek July 19–20. Siege of Atlanta July 22-August 25. Flank movement on Jonesboro August 25–30. Battle of Jonesboro August 31-September 1. Lovejoy's Station September 2–6. Pursuit of Hood into Alabama October 3–26. At Athens, Ga., October 31 to November 23. March to Columbia, Tenn., November 23–24. Columbia, Duck River, November 24–27. Battle of Franklin November 30. Battle of Nashville December 15–16. Pursuit of Hood to the Tennessee River December 17–28. Moved to Huntsville, Ala., and duty there until March 1865. Operations in eastern Tennessee March 15-April 22. Duty at Strawberry Plains and Nashville until June.

Casualties
The regiment lost a total of 210 men during service; 7 officers and 78 enlisted men killed or mortally wounded, 1 officer and 124 enlisted men died of disease.

Commanders
 Colonel Oliver Hazard Payne

Notable members
 Corporal Franklin Carr, Company D - Medal of Honor recipient for action at the battle of Nashville, December 16, 1864

See also
 List of Ohio Civil War units
 Ohio in the Civil War

Notes

References

External links
 Ohio in the Civil War: 124th Ohio Volunteer Infantry by Larry Stevens
 National flag of the 124th Ohio Infantry

Military units and formations established in 1863
Military units and formations disestablished in 1865
Units and formations of the Union Army from Ohio
1863 establishments in Ohio